Heterotheca rutteri, the Huachuca goldenaster or Rutter's false goldenaster, is a rare North American species of flowering plant in the family Asteraceae. It has been found only in the Huachuca and Santa Rita Mountains of southern Arizona and northern Sonora.

References

rutteri
Flora of Sonora
Flora of Arizona
Plants described in 1879